A Coyote's in the House is a 2004 novel written by Elmore Leonard. The book was Leonard's only novel for children. The book's story involves a hip coyote, and an aging movie-star dog who wants to trade places with him. The novel features references to an earlier novel by Leonard, Get Shorty, specifically to Harry Zimm and his production studio.

References

Coyote's in the House
Coyote's in the House
Novels by Elmore Leonard

HarperCollins books
Children's novels about animals
2004 children's books